The Arrondissement of Diksmuide is one of the eight administrative arrondissements in the Province of West Flanders, Belgium. It is one of the two arrondissements that form the Judicial Arrondissement of Veurne.

Municipalities
The Administrative Arrondissement of Diksmuide consists of the following municipalities:
 Diksmuide
 Houthulst
 Koekelare
 Kortemark
 Lo-Reninge

References 

Diksmuide